Pochavaram is a village in Krishna district of the Indian state of Andhra Pradesh. It is located in Vatsavai mandal of Vijayawada revenue division.

References

Villages in Krishna district